The University of Exeter Men's Hockey Club is a field hockey club based in Exeter, Devon, England. The club plays its matches at the Sports Park on the University of Exeter's Streatham Campus. There is a water based pitch and a hybrid pitch.

The Men's 1st XI play in the Premier Division of the Men's England Hockey League, which is the highest division in Great Britain.

The club fields six men's teams which compete in BUCS leagues on Wednesdays and in local and National leagues at the weekend. A seventh XI was formed in 2014, serving as a Development XI for those working towards a berth in one of the six regular outfits, which now also participates in the local weekend league.

EUMHC work in the community providing coaches to the England Hockey Junior Development Centres (JDC) and Junior Academy Centres (JAC). Furthermore, the club supports a twenty team intramural hockey competition. In all, just over 450 students play hockey at the University of Exeter on a weekly basis.

A committee, elected annually by the members, organises the club's affairs and works in conjunction with the University sport department, Athletic Union and other agencies involved in the provision of sport within the higher education sphere. The current Club Captain is Freddy Esplen and Nick Thorn serves as Chairman. Simon Tyson serves as 1st XI manager while Harry Jones serves as 1st XI coach and Head of Hockey.

Internationals
The club has contributed players to international sides, including:

Ollie Payne (England and Great Britain)
Henry Saxby (Scotland U21)
Billy Collins (Wales U21)
Ben Fox (England U21 & GB EDP)
Jake Payton  (England U21 & GB EDP)
Nick Nurse  (England U21 & GB EDP)
Lewis Wilcher  (England U21 & GB EDP)
Ollie Drummond  (England U21 & GB EDP)

Captains
 1XI - Jake Payton 
 2XI - Ben Entwistle 
 3XI - Seb Hood 
 4XI - Cam Swatton 
 5XI - Jack Denegri 
 6XI - Michael Osner
 7XI - Alexi De Unger

Charity work
The club has raised money for Movember, an annual event involving the growing of moustaches during the month of November to raise awareness of men's health issues; Mind, a mental health charity; and Help for Heroes.

References

English field hockey clubs
Sport in Exeter
Hockey Club
Exeter